Hyperborea, in Greek mythology, was a land "beyond the North Wind".

Hyperborea may also refer to:
Hyperborea (band), a Finnish folk music group
Hyperborea (album), an album by Tangerine Dream
Hyperborean cycle, a cycle of ten fantasy stories by Clark Ashton Smith
Hyperborea (collection), a collection of Clark Ashton Smith's Hyperborean stories
Hyperborea (Conan), a nation in the fictional world of Conan the Barbarian
Hyperborea (game), a board game
"Hyperborea", a track by Biosphere from the 1997 album Substrata
"Hyperborea", a track by Horse the Band from the 2007 album A Natural Death
1309 Hyperborea, an asteroid
Hyperborea, a monotypic genus of tiger moths now classified Chelis czekanowskii
Ochotona hyperborea, a species of pika known as the Northern pika